Hugh Wilson MacKay (born 1954 or 1955) is Canadian politician. He was elected to the Nova Scotia House of Assembly in the 2017 provincial election, defeating incumbent Denise Peterson-Rafuse of the NDP. An independent, he represented the electoral district of Chester-St. Margaret's until 2021.

Early life and education
Born in Nova Scotia, MacKay graduated from Dalhousie University in 1978. MacKay then graduated from Nova Scotia Community College Centre of Geographic Sciences in 1980.

Career
He was the president of the Geomatics Association of Nova Scotia in 2015/16. He is a graduate of Nova Scotia Community College and Dalhousie University.

Personal life
MacKay lives in Glen Haven, Nova Scotia, and has two adult children, Sarah and Kevin.

Controversy
In October 2019, it was announced Hugh MacKay was charged with driving under the influence of alcohol over the 2019 Thanksgiving weekend. RCMP said MacKay was arrested without incident. He was subsequently fined $2,000 and his license suspended for one year after his blood alcohol level was found to be over twice the legal limit.

Electoral record

2017 general election

References

Year of birth missing (living people)
Dalhousie University alumni
Living people
Nova Scotia Liberal Party MLAs
21st-century Canadian politicians